Allopaa is a small genus of frogs in the family Dicroglossidae. Their distribution is restricted to Kashmir region of India and Pakistan. The phylogenetic placement of this genus has not been addressed with molecular methods and remains uncertain.

Species
There are only two recognized species in the genus Allopaa:
 Allopaa barmoachensis (Khan and Tasnim, 1989)
 Allopaa hazarensis (Dubois and Khan, 1979)

Allopaa barmoachensis might be a synonym of Allopaa hazarensis.

References

 
Amphibian genera
Frogs of Asia
Dicroglossidae